Laminar means "flat". Laminar may refer to:

Terms in science and engineering:

Laminar electronics or organic electronics, a branch of material sciences dealing with electrically conductive polymers and small molecules
 Laminar armour or "banded mail", armour made from horizontal overlapping rows or bands of solid armour plates
 Laminar flame speed, a property of a combustible mixture
 Laminar flow, a fluid flowing in parallel layers with no disruption between the layers
 Laminar organization, the way certain tissues are arranged in layers
Laminar set family, a mathematical structure.
A common leaf shape.
Proper nouns:
 Laminar Research, a  Columbia, South Carolina, software company
 Icaro Laminar, an Italian hang glider design
 Pazmany Laminar, a  personal light aircraft designed by Ladislao Pazmany

See also
 Lamina (disambiguation)